Lingchuan may refer to two counties in the People's Republic of China:

Lingchuan County, Guangxi (灵川县)
Lingchuan County, Shanxi (陵川县)